This article details the canoeing at the 2020 Summer Olympics qualifying phase.  Similar to 2012 and 2016 format, a qualification system has been set up for both slalom and sprint canoeing at these games. The quotas have already been set for each event by the International Canoe Federation in October 2018.

Qualification summary

Slalom

For the slalom events, the men and women competed for each in C-1 and K-1. Qualifications were allocated to NOCs, not to specific competitors. NOCs were limited to one boat per event. Qualification spots were earned as follows:
 World Championships: The top placed boats (considering only one boat per NOC) earned their NOCs a qualification. 18 qualification spots were available in the K-1 events, and 11 in the C-1.
 Continental Qualification Events: Only NOCs that did not earn qualification in a given event through the World Championships were eligible. For the K-1 and C-1 events, 1 qualification spot was available for each continent. 
 Host country: Japan, as the host country, is guaranteed one entry in each event if not already qualified.
 Tripartite Commission: Canoeing (both slalom and sprint) has a total of 2 qualification spots that would be awarded through Tripartite Commission invitations.
 Reallocation: Unused quota spots were reallocated.

Timeline

Qualification table

Italic: National federation has qualified a boat but the athlete that did this was already counted in another boat
* No continental qualifying race held as less than three nations are eligible.
** National federation is limited to two athlete quota places at a continental qualifying event.

Sprint

NOCs are limited to one boat per event, and in kayaking to six men and six women positions. In Canoeing, the maximum is three men and three women. Meaning a country can enter up to 18 athletes overall. Qualification enables an NOC to participate, not necessarily in the person of the paddler who gained the place. Quotas given are for boats. Qualification spots were earned as follows:
 World Championships: The top placed boats (considering only one boat per NOC) earned their NOCs a qualification. 5 boat qualification spots were available in the K-1 events with an additional place reserved for the host country each in the men's 1000 m and women's 500 m, 6 in the K-2 events, 10 in the K-4 events, 6 in the C-1 events (1 of which was reserved for the host country in the 1000 metre event), and 8 in the C-2 event.
 World Cup 2: The top placed boat (considering only one boat per NOC) in each individual event earned their NOCs a qualification.
 Continental Qualification Events: Only NOCs that did not earn qualification in a given event through the World Championships were eligible. For the K-1 and C-1 events, 1 boat qualification spot was available for each continent (except that Europe received 2 spots). For the K-2 and C-2 events, Europe was guaranteed two boat qualification spots but only 6 total qualification spots were available for the remaining 4 continents; these were assigned to continents based on World Championship results: the best ranked non-qualifying NOCs from four different continents at the World Championships earned their continent one boat qualification place. 
 Host country: Japan, as the host country, was guaranteed entries in certain events as listed in the World Championship section.
 Tripartite Commission: Canoeing (both slalom and sprint) had a total of 2 qualification spots that would be awarded through Tripartite Commission invitations.
 Reallocation: Unused quota spots were reallocated. In practice, this was used where some of an NOC's competitors in a larger boat category also competed in a smaller category, freeing up the athlete quota spot that NOC had earned in the smaller category.

Timeline

Qualification table
The following boats and athletes qualified.

In the men's kayak category, Spain had qualifying boats in the K-4 500m, K-2 1000m, and K-1 200m; because each NOC could earn a maximum of 6 athlete spots, the K-1 200m athlete quota spot was reallocated to Sweden. Hungary qualified boats in the K-4, K-2, and K-1 1000m, requiring reallocation of the K-1 1000m place. Josef Dostál of the Czech Republic qualified in the K-1 1000m and was also a part of a qualifying K-2 1000m boat. The athlete quota spot from the K-1 was reallocated. The two spots went to the next best in K-1 1000m, but could not be allocated to France (Étienne Hubert was France's K-1 1000m athlete, but had already earned a spot in K-2) or to Spain (which already had 6 athlete quotas), so went to Belarus and Argentina as the first two possible recipients. Japan earned a team spot in the K-4, so its host spot in the K-1 1000m also head to be reallocated; it could not go to Australia (which had 6 places already), so 11th-placed Serbia qualified.

In the men's canoe category, Isaquias Queiroz of Brazil qualified in both the C-1 and C-2 events; his C-1 athlete quota spot was reallocated. This spot went to the next-best NOC in C-2, the Czech Republic, as it could fill the C-2 boat because one the two athletes (Martin Fuksa) had already earned an athlete quota spot in C-1 and only 1 spot was needed to fill the boat.

In the women's kayak category, numerous quota spots were reallocated, in a two-step process. The first step was that athletes who qualified in both K-1 events were assigned the 500m place and the 200m place was reallocated to the next boat in the 200m. Lisa Carrington of New Zealand and Emma Jørgensen fit that criterion; they were treated as qualifying in the 500m and their 200m spots reallocated to Hungary and Serbia. Because the Serbia spot would have gone to Milica Starović, who (like Carrington and Jørgensen) had qualified in the 500m, that spot was further reallocated to Portugal.

The second step in women's kayak was for athletes qualifying in multiple boat sizes. Volha Khudzenka of Belarus was part of the K-4, K-2, and K-1 500m boats that qualified, requiring reallocation of her K-2 and K-1 quota places. Maryna Litvinchuk was also in both the K-4 and K-2 boats for Belarus, so her K-2 quota place had to reallocated. Karolina Naja and Anna Puławska were in Poland's K-4 and K-2 boats; both of their quota places from the K-2 were reallocated. The same was true of Sarah Guyot and Manon Hostens of France and Mariya Povkh of Ukraine. Mariia Kichasova-Skoryk, also of Ukraine, qualified in both the K-4 boat and the K-1 200m; her K-1 spot was reallocated. Finally, Carrington was part of New Zealand's K-4 boat, so her K-1 500m spot was reallocated. These 10 spots were allocated to fill K-4 boats (ROC received 4 and Denmark netted 3, adding to Jørgensen's K-1 500m spot). The remaining 3 places were not enough to qualify Great Britain in the K-4, so the next step was allocating them to the K-2. The 3 remaining spots then went first to China in the K-2. This left 1 spot; Austria was next in the K-2 but neither athlete was qualified yet, so the spot would not fill the boat and therefore went to the K-1 500m. Sweden got the quota as next NOC in the K-1 500m.

In the women's canoe, Maria Mailliard of Chile qualified in both the C-2 and the C-1; her quota place was reallocated. The 1 reallocated spot was not enough to fill a C-2 boat (Japan did not have a qualifier in C-1), so went to the next C-1 competitor: Poland.

References

Qualification
Qualification for the 2020 Summer Olympics
Olympics qualification
Olympics qualification